STS-51-D was the 16th flight of NASA's Space Shuttle program, and the fourth flight of Space Shuttle Discovery. The launch of STS-51-D from Kennedy Space Center (KSC), Florida, on April 12, 1985, was delayed by 55 minutes, after a boat strayed into the restricted Solid Rocket Booster (SRB) recovery zone. STS-51-D was the third shuttle mission to be extended.

On April 19, 1985, after a week-long flight, Discovery conducted the fifth shuttle landing at KSC. The shuttle suffered extensive brake damage and a ruptured tire during landing. This forced all subsequent shuttle landings to be done at Edwards Air Force Base, California, until the development and implementation of nose wheel steering made landings at KSC more feasible.

Crew

Spacewalk 
  Hoffman and Griggs  – EVA 1
 EVA 1 Start: April 16, 1985
 EVA 1 End: April 16, 1985
 Duration: 3 hours, 6 minutes

Crew seating arrangements

Mission summary 
During STS-51-D, the shuttle crew deployed two communications satellites: Telesat-I (Anik C1) and Syncom IV-3 (also known as Leasat-3); both were Hughes-built satellites. Telesat-I was attached to a Payload Assist Module (PAM-D) motor and successfully deployed. Syncom IV-3, however, failed to initiate antenna deployment and spin-up, or ignite its perigee kick motor upon deployment. The mission was consequently extended by two days to ensure that the satellite's spacecraft sequencer start lever was in its proper position. Griggs and Hoffman performed an unscheduled Extra-Vehicular Activity (EVA) to attach homemade "Flyswatter" devices to the shuttle's Remote Manipulator System (Canadarm). Seddon then engaged the satellite's start lever using the RMS, but again the post-deployment sequence did not begin. The satellite was subsequently retrieved, repaired and successfully redeployed during the STS-51-I mission later that year.

Discoverys other mission payloads included the Continuous Flow Electrophoresis System III (CFES-III), which was flying for sixth time; two Shuttle Student Involvement Program (SSIP) experiments; the American Flight Echo-cardiograph (AFE); two Getaway specials (GASs); a set of Phase Partitioning Experiments (PPE); an astronomical photography verification test; various medical experiments; and "Toys in Space", an informal study of the behavior of simple toys in a microgravity environment, with the results being made available to school students upon the shuttle's return.

During the shuttle's landing at KSC on April 19, 1985, extensive brake damage was suffered, and a landing gear tire ruptured. This prompted future shuttle flights to land at Edwards Air Force Base, California, until effective nose wheel steering could be implemented to reduce risks during landing.

Wake-up calls 
NASA began a tradition of playing music to astronauts during the Project Gemini, and first used music to wake up a flight crew during Apollo 15. Each track is specially chosen, often by the astronauts' families, and usually has a special meaning to an individual member of the crew, or is applicable to their daily activities.

Gallery

See also 

 List of human spaceflights
 List of Space Shuttle missions

References

External links 
 NASA mission summary
 STS-51D Video Highlights 

Space Shuttle missions
1985 in spaceflight
1985 in the United States
Spacecraft launched in 1985
Spacecraft which reentered in 1985